Make-up or makeup may refer to:

 Cosmetics, for use in face-to-face interactions
 Theatrical makeup, for performers 
 Prosthetic makeup 
 Renewing or restoring an interpersonal or intimate relationship

Music
 Make-Up (American band), a Washington DC area band
 Make-Up (Japanese band), a Japanese band
 Make Up (album), an album by Flower Travellin' Band, or the title song
 Make Up (EP), an EP by Hyomin
 Make Up (record label), see RecRec Music
 "Make Up", a song from Lou Reed's 1972 album Transformer
 "Make Up", a song by The Script on the album Freedom Child
 "Make Up", a song by Ariana Grande from the album Thank U, Next
 "Make Up (Vice and Jason Derulo song)", 2018

Movies
 Make-Up (1937 film), a British film
 Make-up (2002 film), a Kannada film
 Make-Up (2014 film), a Korean film
 Make Up (2019 film), an English film

See also
 Body painting